Rear Admiral Nigel Greenwood  (born London, UK) is a retired Royal Canadian Navy officer. His last posting was as Commander Maritime Forces Pacific.

He graduated from Royal Roads Military College.

He also served as Assistant Chief of Maritime Staff (now known as Deputy Commander of the Royal Canadian Navy)

Awards and decorations 
Greenwood's personal awards and decorations include the following:

 Command Commendation

References 

Living people
Canadian admirals
Year of birth missing (living people)
Military personnel from London